Shilpa Shetty (born 8 June 1975) is an Indian actress, film producer, businesswoman, author & former model who works in the Bollywood film industry. She made her acting debut in Baazigar, for which she received a nomination for the Filmfare Award for Lux New Face of the Year. As an actress, Shetty has won 2 awards out of 10 nominations including 1 Bollywood Movie Award and 1 Zee Cine Award.

Shetty received several honors for her humanitarian causes including the IIFA Special Award for Global Impact. In 2007, she was awarded the Honorary Doctorate by the University of Leeds. In 2009, IIFA-FICCI Frames Awards awarded her with the "Most Powerful Entertainers of the Decade" with 9 other recipients.

Major awards

Apsara Film & Television Producers Guild Awards 

The Apsara Film & Television Producers Guild Awards are presented by the Apsara Producers Guild to honour and recognise the excellence of their peers to recognize excellence in film and television.

Bollywood Movie Awards
The Bollywood Movie Awards was an annual film award ceremony held in Long Island, New York, United States between 1999 and 2007 celebrating films and actors from the Bollywood film industry. Shetty won 1 award out of 4 nominations. She was the first-ever winner of the Bollywood Movie Award - Best Supporting Actress and received a nomination for the Bollywood Movie Award - Best Actress.

Filmfare Awards
The Filmfare Awards are presented annually by The Times Group to honor both artistic and technical excellence of professionals in the Hindi language film industry of India. Shetty received four nominations, one in the Lux New Face of the Year category, two in the Best Supporting Actress category and one in the Best Actress category.

Filmfare Awards South
Filmfare Awards South is the South Indian segment of the annual Filmfare Awards, presented by the Filmfare magazine of The Times Group to honour both artistic and technical excellence of professionals in the Telugu cinema, Tamil cinema, Kannada cinema and Malayalam cinema.

IIFA Awards
The International Indian Film Academy Awards are presented annually by the International Indian Film Academy to honour both artistic and technical excellence of professionals in Bollywood, the Hindi language film industry. Shetty has been nominated twice for the Best Actress Award.

Indian Television Academy Awards

Star Screen Awards
The Star Screen Awards is the only award ceremony in India to be involved with the Executive Director and the Governor of the Academy of Motion Picture Arts and Sciences. They are presented annually to honor professional excellence in the Hindi language film industry of India. Shetty has received two nominations, one in the Best Actress category and one in the Best Comedian category.

Zee Cine Awards
The Zee Cine Awards is an award ceremony for the Hindi film industry, now held abroad each year. Shetty has received a nomination in the Best Actor - Female category and won the Best Actor in a Supporting Role - Female award once.

Honours and recognitions
 2005: Indian "Diva of the Year" by SaharaOne Television viewers.
 2007: Silver Star Award for her outstanding contribution to humanitarian causes.
 2007: Rajiv Gandhi Award
 2007: Honorary Doctorate by University of Leeds
 2009: Shetty was among the 10 recipients of the IIFA-FICCI Frames Awards for the "Most Powerful Entertainers of the Decade".

References

Shetty, Shilpa